The Apolo cotinga or palkachupa cotinga (Phibalura boliviana) is a species of passerine bird in the family Cotingidae. It is a member of the genus Phibalura.

The Apolo cotinga was collected in Bolivia in 1902 and in 1930 described as a subspecies of the swallow-tailed cotinga (Phibalura flavirostris boliviana). The bird was rediscovered in 2000 (after 98 years without any records). It is restricted to the vicinity of Apolo in Bolivia. The population is threatened by habitat loss and therefore listed as an endangered species.

Phibalura boliviana is treated as a separate species because of eye color, more curved bill, color of feet and tarsi, longer tail and different  vocabulary. The Apolo cotinga is sedentary, while the swallow-tailed cotinga migrates to lower elevations during the southern winter. 

However, the South American Classification Committee decided not to split the swallow-tailed cotinga in 2011, and a large molecular phylogenetic study of the family Cotingidae published in 2014 found only small differences between the DNA sequences of the two taxa and thus did not provide evidence to support the treatment of P. f. boliviana as a separate species.

References

Cotingidae
Birds of Bolivia
Apolo cotinga